Norte Catarinense is a mesoregion in the Brazilian state of Santa Catarina. Its largest and principal city is Joinville.

Mesoregions of Santa Catarina (state)